Season eight of the television program American Experience originally aired on the PBS network in the United States on October 16, 1995 and concluded on February 26, 1996. This is the eighth season to feature David McCullough as the host. The season contained nine new episodes and began with the film Murder of the Century.

Episodes

References

1995 American television seasons
1996 American television seasons
American Experience